Viktorija Žemaitytė (born 11 March 1985 in Kaunas) is a Lithuanian female track and field athlete, who represented Lithuania in the heptathlon at the 2008 Summer Olympics.

Achievements

References

External links
 
 
 
 
 

1985 births
Living people
Lithuanian female hurdlers
Lithuanian heptathletes
Olympic athletes of Lithuania
Athletes (track and field) at the 2008 Summer Olympics
Universiade medalists in athletics (track and field)
Universiade gold medalists for Lithuania
Universiade silver medalists for Lithuania
Competitors at the 2005 Summer Universiade
Medalists at the 2007 Summer Universiade
Medalists at the 2011 Summer Universiade